Wolak Peak is a peak in the Inland Forts, located 1 nautical mile (1.9 km) northwest of St. Pauls Mountain in the Asgard Range, Victoria Land. Named by Advisory Committee on Antarctic Names (US-ACAN) for Richard J. Wolak, administrative assistant at McMurdo Station in the 1972–73 and 1973–74 seasons; he was station manager at South Pole Station in 1975.

Mountains of the Asgard Range
McMurdo Dry Valleys